Elaine Goodlad (born May 2, 1964) is a professional figure competitor and makeup artist. She is a makeup artist used by fitness models, photographers, and fitness & figure competitors for photo shoots and contest times.

Biography
Elaine grew up in Saskatchewan, Canada in a small town and farming community to Baptist parents. When she was in high school she was involved in sports such as track and field and volleyball. At the age of twenty, Elaine discovered the gym, and used the structure and discipline of the weight training to overcome some of her personal issues and gain new confidence. She continued her weight training regime with the help of a powerlifter, Terry Goodlad who helped her to make the right changes in her regime and helped her improve her physique.

Vital Stats
 Full Name: Elaine Goodlad
 Birthday: May 2
 Place of Birth: Saskatchewan, Canada
 Current state of Residence: Las Vegas
 Occupation: Figure competitor, personal trainer, fitness model, Professional make-up artist.
 Height: 5'7"
 Weight (In Season): 130-132 lbs. (Off-Season):138-140 lbs.
 Eye Color: Blue

Bodybuilding philosophy
Goodlad's training consists of simple compound movements with mostly free weights (she uses only a few cable exercises and machine exercises). She typically weight trains 5 days a week, and in the off-season she focuses on her glutes, hamstrings, and shoulders as primary muscle groups. Goodlad usually trains two body parts per day on the off-season, and performs between one and two cardio sessions a day, 7 days a week (one with her weight training and another one at night).

Contest History
2002 NPC Emerald Cup, 1st (Tall) and Overall winner
2003 IFBB Arnold Classic Figure International, 6th
2003 IFBB Jan Tana Pro Classic, 6th
2003 IFBB New York Pro Championships, 5th
2003 IFBB Night of Champions, 5th
2003 IFBB Figure Olympia, 11th
2003 IFBB Show of Strength Pro Championship, 6th
2003 IFBB Pittsburgh Pro Figure, 5th
2004 IFBB California Pro Figure, 1st
2004 IFBB Figure International, 8th
2004 IFBB Pittsburgh Pro Figure, 3rd
2004 IFBB Show of Strength Pro Championship, 8th
2004 IFBB Figure Olympia, 8th
2005 IFBB Figure International 8th
2005 IFBB Charlotte Pro Championships, 8th
2005 IFBB Europa Supershow, 6th
2006 IFBB Figure International 10th

References

Magazine Reference
Stoddard, Grant. EG. California: Muscle and Fitness. March 2006 Edition. . (New York, NY: Weider Publications, LLC., a division of American Media Inc., 2006.). Section: Training and Fitness: pages 218-222 covers Goodlad's article.

External links
Interview #1
Interview #2
Oxygen Profile

Body Sport Page
Model Page
Article

1964 births
Living people
Fitness and figure competitors